Heather Webber may refer to: 

 Heather Webber (General Hospital), a character on the soap opera General Hospital
 Heather Webber (author), author of romance, mystery and paranormal novels